The  (IJA) was the official ground-based armed force of the Empire of Japan from 1868 to 1945. It was controlled by the Imperial Japanese Army General Staff Office and the Ministry of the Army, both of which were nominally subordinate to the Emperor of Japan as supreme commander of the army and the Imperial Japanese Navy. Later an Inspectorate General of Aviation became the third agency with oversight of the army.  At its height, the IJA was one of the most powerful and influential political forces in Imperial Japan, and an often dominant force on the battlefield. The IJA is notorious for its numerous war crimes committed during the Second Sino-Japanese War and the Pacific War, such as the Rape of Nanjing and the Bataan Death March.

History

Origins (1868–1871)
In the mid-19th century, Japan had no unified national army and the country was made up of feudal domains (han) with the Tokugawa shogunate (bakufu) in overall control, which had ruled Japan since 1603. The bakufu army, although a large force, was only one among others, and bakufu efforts to control the nation depended upon the cooperation of its vassals' armies. The opening of the country after two centuries of seclusion subsequently led to the Meiji Restoration and the Boshin War in 1868. The domains of Satsuma and Chōshū came to dominate the coalition against the shogunate.

Boshin War

On 27 January 1868, tensions between the shogunate and imperial sides came to a head when Tokugawa Yoshinobu marched on Kyoto, accompanied by a 15,000-strong force, some of which had been trained by French military advisers. They were opposed by 5,000 troops from the Satsuma, Chōshū, and Tosa domains. At the two road junctions of Toba and Fushimi just south of Kyoto, the two forces clashed. On the second day, an Imperial banner was given to the defending troops and a member of the Imperial Family, the Prince Ninnaji, was named nominal commander in chief, in effect making the pro-imperial forces officially an  The bakufu forces eventually retreated to Osaka, with the remaining forces ordered to retreat to Edo. Yoshinobu and his closest advisors left for Edo by ship. The encounter at Toba–Fushimi between the imperial and shogunate forces marked the beginning of the conflict. With the court in Kyoto firmly behind the Satsuma-Chōshū-Tosa coalition, other domains that were sympathetic to the causesuch as Tottori (Inaba), Aki (Hiroshima), and Hizen (Saga)emerged to take a more active role in military operations. Western domains that had either supported the shogunate or remained neutral also quickly announced their support of the restoration movement.

The nascent Meiji state required a new military command for its operations against the shogunate. In 1868, the "Imperial Army" being just a loose amalgam of domain armies, the government created four military divisions: the Tōkaidō, Tōsandō, San'indō, and Hokurikudō, each of which was named for a major highway. Overseeing these four armies was a new high command, the Eastern Expeditionary High Command (Tōsei daisō tokufu), whose nominal head was prince Arisugawa-no-miya, with two court nobles as senior staff officers. This connected the loose assembly of domain forces with the imperial court, which was the only national institution in a still unformed nation-state. The army continually emphasized its link with the imperial court: firstly, to legitimize its cause; secondly, to brand enemies of the imperial government as enemies of the court and traitors; and, lastly, to gain popular support. To supply food, weapons, and other supplies for the campaign, the imperial government established logistical relay stations along three major highways. These small depots held stockpiled material supplied by local pro-government domains, or confiscated from the bakufu and others opposing the imperial government. Local villagers were routinely impressed as porters to move and deliver supplies between the depots and frontline units.

Struggles to form a centralized army
Initially, the new army fought under makeshift arrangements, with unclear channels of command and control and no reliable recruiting base. Although fighting for the imperial cause, many of the units were loyal to their domains rather than the imperial court. In March 1869, the imperial government created various administrative offices, including a military branch; and in the following month organized an imperial bodyguard of 400 to 500, which consisted of Satsuma and Chōshū troops strengthened by veterans of the encounter at Toba–Fushimi, as well as yeoman and masterless samurai from various domains. The imperial court told the domains to restrict the size of their local armies and to contribute to funding a national officers' training school in Kyoto. However, within a few months the government disbanded both the military branch and the imperial bodyguard: the former was ineffective while the latter lacked modern weaponry and equipment. To replace them, two new organizations were created. One was the military affairs directorate which was composed of two bureaus, one for the army and one for the navy. The directorate drafted an army from troop contributions from each domain proportional to each domain's annual rice production (koku). This conscript army (chōheigun) integrated samurai and commoners from various domains into its ranks. As the war continued, the military affairs directorate expected to raise troops from the wealthier domains and, in June, the organization of the army was fixed, where each domain was required to send ten men for each 10,000 koku of rice produced. However, this policy put the imperial government in direct competition with the domains for military recruitment, which was not rectified until April 1868, when the government banned the domains from enlisting troops. Consequently, the quota system never fully worked as intended and was abolished the following year.

The Imperial forces encountered numerous difficulties during the war, especially during the campaign in Eastern Japan. Headquarters in faraway Kyoto often proposed plans at odds with the local conditions, which led to tensions with officers in the field, who in many cases ignored centralized direction in favor of unilateral action. The army lacked a strong central staff that was capable of enforcing orders. Consequently, military units were at the mercy of individual commanders' leadership and direction. This was not helped by the absence of a unified tactical doctrine, which left units to fight according to the tactics favored by their respective commanders. There was increased resentment by many lower ranked commanders as senior army positions were monopolized by the nobility together with samurai from Chōshū and Satsuma. The use of commoners within the new army created resentment among the samurai class. Although the nascent Meiji government achieved military success, the war left a residue of disgruntled warriors and marginalized commoners, together with a torn social fabric.

Foundation of a national army (1871–1873)

After the defeat of the Tokugawa shogunate and operations in Northeastern Honshu and Hokkaido a true national army did not exist. Many in the restoration coalition had recognized the need for a strong centralized authority and although the imperial side was victorious, the early Meiji government was weak and the leaders had to maintain their standing with their domains whose military forces was essential for whatever the government needed to achieve. The leaders of the restoration were divided over the future organization of the army. Ōmura Masujirō who had sought a strong central government at the expense of the domains advocated for the creation of a standing national army along European lines
under the control of the government, the introduction of conscription for commoners and the abolition of the samurai class. Ōkubo Toshimichi preferred a small volunteer force consisting of former samurai. Ōmura's views for modernizing Japan's military led to his assassination in 1869 and his ideas were largely implemented after his death by Yamagata Aritomo. Aritomo has been described as the father of the Imperial Japanese Army. Yamagata had commanded mixed commoner-samurai Chōshū units during the Boshin War and was convinced of the merit of peasant soldiers. Although he himself was part of the samurai class, albeit of insignificant lower status, Yamagata distrusted the warrior class, several members of whom he regarded as clear dangers to the Meiji state.

Establishment of the Imperial Guard and institutional reforms

In March 1871, the War Ministry announced the creation of an Imperial Guard (Goshinpei) of six thousand men, consisting of nine infantry battalions, two artillery batteries and two cavalry squadrons. The emperor donated 100,000 ryō to underwrite the new unit, which was subordinate to the court. It was composed of members of the Satsuma, Chōshū and Tosa domains, who had led the restoration. Satsuma provided four battalions of infantry and four artillery batteries; Chōshū provided three battalions of infantry; Tosa two battalions of infantry, two squadrons of cavalry, and two artillery batteries. For the first time, the Meiji government was able to organize a large body of soldiers under a consistent rank and pay scheme with uniforms, which were loyal to the government rather than the domains. The Imperial Guard's principal mission was to protect the throne by suppressing domestic samurai revolts, peasant uprisings and anti-government demonstrations. The possession of this military force was a factor in the government's abolition of the han system.

The military ministry (Hyōbushō) was reorganized in July 1871; on August 29, simultaneously with the decree abolishing the domains, the Dajōkan ordered local daimyos to disband their private armies and turn their weapons over to the government. Although the government played on the foreign threat, especially Russia's southward expansion, to justify a national army, the immediately perceived danger was domestic insurrection. Consequently, on August 31, the country was divided into four military districts, each with its own chindai (garrison) to deal with peasant uprisings or samurai insurrections. The Imperial Guard formed the Tokyo garrison, whereas troops from the former domains filled the ranks of the Osaka, Kumamoto, and Sendai garrisons. The four garrisons had a total of about 8,000 troopsmostly infantry, but also a few hundred artillerymen and engineers. Smaller detachments of troops also guarded outposts at Kagoshima, Fushimi, Nagoya, Hiroshima, and elsewhere. By late December 1871, the army set modernization and coastal defense as priorities; long-term plans were devised for an armed force to maintain internal security, defend strategic coastal areas, train and educate military and naval officers, and build arsenals and supply depots. Despite previous rhetoric about the foreign menace, little substantive planning was directed against Russia. In February 1872, the military ministry was abolished and separate army and navy ministries were established.

Conscription

The conscription ordinance enacted on January 10, 1873, made universal military service compulsory for all male subjects in the country. The law called for a total of seven years of military service: three years in the regular army (jōbigun), two years in the reserve (dai'ichi kōbigun), and an additional two years in the second reserve (daini kōbigun). All able-bodied males between the ages of 17 and 40 were considered members of the national guard (kokumingun), which would only see service in a severe national crisis, such as an attack or invasion of Japan. The conscription examination decided which group of recruits would enter the army, those who failed the exam were excused from all examinations except for the national guard. Recruits who passed entered the draft lottery, where some were selected for active duty. A smaller group would be selected for replacement duty (hojū-eki) should anything happen to any of the active duty soldiers; the rest were dismissed. One of the primary differences between the samurai and the peasant class was the right to bear arms; this ancient privilege was suddenly extended to every male in the nation. There were several exemptions, including criminals, those who could show hardship, the physically unfit, heads of households or heirs, students, government bureaucrats, and teachers. A conscript could also purchase an exemption for ¥270, which was an enormous sum for the time and which restricted this privilege to the wealthy. Under the new 1873 ordinance, the conscript army was composed mainly of second and third sons of impoverished farmers who manned the regional garrisons, while former samurai controlled the Imperial Guard and the Tokyo garrison.

Initially, because of the army's small size and numerous exemptions, relatively few young men were actually conscripted for a three-year term on active duty. In 1873, the army numbered approximately 17,900 from a population of 35 million at the time; it doubled to about 33,000 in 1875. The conscription program slowly built up the numbers. Public unrest began in 1874, reaching the apex in the Satsuma Rebellion of 1877, which used the slogans, "oppose conscription", "oppose elementary schools", and "fight Korea". It took a year for the new army to crush the uprising, but the victories proved critical in creating and stabilizing the Imperial government and to realize sweeping social, economic and political reforms that enabled Japan to become a modern state that could stand comparison to France, Germany, and other European powers.

Further development and modernization (1873–1894)

Foreign assistance
The early Imperial Japanese Army was developed with the assistance of advisors from France, through the second French military mission to Japan (1872–80), and the third French military mission to Japan (1884–89). However, after France's defeat in 1871 the Japanese government switched to the victorious Germans as a model. From 1886 to April 1890, it hired German military advisors (Major Jakob Meckel, replaced in 1888 by von Wildenbrück and Captain von Blankenbourg) to assist in the training of the Japanese General Staff. In 1878, the Imperial Japanese Army General Staff Office, based on the German General Staff, was established directly under the Emperor and was given broad powers for military planning and strategy.

Other known foreign military consultants were Major Pompeo Grillo from the Kingdom of Italy, who worked at the Osaka foundry from 1884 to 1888, followed by Major Quaratezi from 1889 to 1890; and Captain Schermbeck from the Netherlands, who worked on improving coastal defenses from 1883 to 1886. Japan did not use foreign military advisors between 1890 and 1918, until the French military mission to Japan (1918–19), headed by Commandant Jacques-Paul Faure, was requested to assist in the development of the Japanese air services.

Taiwan Expedition

The Japanese invasion of Taiwan under Qing rule in 1874 was a punitive expedition by Japanese military forces in response to the Mudan Incident of December 1871. The Paiwan people, who are indigenous peoples of Taiwan, murdered 54 crewmembers of a wrecked merchant vessel from the Ryukyu Kingdom on the southwestern tip of Taiwan. 12 men were rescued by the local Chinese-speaking community and were transferred to Miyako-jima in the Ryukyu Islands. The Empire of Japan used this as an excuse to both assert sovereignty over the Ryukyu Kingdom, which was a tributary state of both Japan and Qing China at the time, and to attempt the same with Taiwan, a Qing territory. It marked the first overseas deployment of the Imperial Japanese Army and Navy.

An Imperial Rescript to Soldiers and Sailors of 1882 called for unquestioning loyalty to the Emperor by the new armed forces and asserted that commands from superior officers were equivalent to commands from the Emperor himself. Thenceforth, the military existed in an intimate and privileged relationship with the imperial institution.

Top-ranking military leaders were given direct access to the Emperor and the authority to transmit his pronouncements directly to the troops. The sympathetic relationship between conscripts and officers, particularly junior officers who were drawn mostly from the peasantry, tended to draw the military closer to the people. In time, most people came to look more for guidance in national matters more to military than to political leaders.

By the 1890s, the Imperial Japanese Army had grown to become the most modern army in Asia: well-trained, well-equipped, and with good morale. However, it was basically an infantry force deficient in cavalry and artillery when compared with its European contemporaries. Artillery pieces, which were purchased from America and a variety of European nations, presented two problems: they were scarce, and the relatively small number that were available were of several different calibers, causing problems with ammunition supply.

First Sino-Japanese War

In the early months of 1894, the Donghak Rebellion broke out in southern Korea and had soon spread throughout the rest of the country, threatening the Korea capital Seoul, itself. The Chinese, since the beginning of May had taken steps to prepare the mobilization of their forces in the provinces of Zhili, Shandong and in Manchuria, as a result of the tense situation on the Korean peninsula. These actions were planned more as an armed demonstration intended to strengthen the Chinese position in Korea, rather than as a preparation for war with Japan. On June 3, the Chinese government accepted the requests from the Korean government to send troops to help quell the rebellion, additionally they also informed the Japanese of the action. It was decided to send 2,500 men to Asan, about 70 km from the capital Seoul. The troops arrived in Asan on June 9 and were additionally reinforced by 400 more on June 25, a total of about 2,900 Chinese soldiers were at Asan.

From the very outset the developments in Korea had been carefully observed in Tokyo. Japanese government had soon become convinced that the Donghak Rebellion would lead to Chinese intervention in Korea. As a result, soon after learning word about the Korean government's request for Chinese military help, immediately ordered all warships in the vicinity to be sent to Pusan and Chemulpo. On June 9, a formation of 420 rikusentai, selected from the crews of the Japanese warships was immediately dispatched to Seoul, where they served temporarily as a counterbalance to the Chinese troops camped at Asan. Simultaneously, the Japanese decided to send a reinforced brigade of approximately 8,000 troops to Korea. The reinforced brigade, included auxiliary units, under the command of General Oshima Yoshimasa was fully transported to Korea by June 27. The Japanese stated to the Chinese that they were willing to withdraw the brigade under General Oshima if the Chinese left Asan prior. However, when on 16 July, 8,000 Chinese troops landed near the entrance of the Taedong River to reinforce Chinese troops garrisoned in Pyongyang, the Japanese delivered Li Hongzhang an ultimatum, threatening to take action if any further troops were sent to Korea. Consequently, General Oshima in Seoul and commanders of the Japanese warships in Korean waters received orders allowing them to initiate military operations if any more Chinese troops were sent to Korea. Despite this ultimatum, Li, considered that Japanese were bluffing and were trying to probe the Chinese readiness to make concessions. He decided, therefore to reinforce Chinese forces in Asan with a further 2,500 troops, 1,300 of which arrived in Asan during the night of July 23–24. At the same time, in the early morning of July 23, the Japanese had taken control of the Royal Palace in Seoul and imprisoned the King Gojong, forcing him to renounce ties with China.

During the almost two-month interval prior to the declaration of war, the two service staffs developed a two-stage operational plan against China. The army's 5th Division would land at Chemulpo to prevent a Chinese advance in Korea while the navy would engage the Beiyang fleet in a decisive battle in order to secure control of the seas. If the navy defeated the Chinese fleet decisively and secured command of the seas, the larger part of the army would undertake immediate landings on the coast between Shanhaiguan and Tientsin, and advance to the Zhili plain in order to defeat the main Chinese forces and bring the war to a swift conclusion. If neither side gained control of the sea and supremacy, the army would concentrate on the occupation of Korea and exclude Chinese influence there. Lastly, if the navy was defeated and consequently lost command of the sea, Japanese forces in Korea would be ordered to hang on and fight a rearguard action while the bulk of the army would remain in Japan in preparation to repel a Chinese invasion. This worst-case scenario also foresaw attempts to rescue the beleaguered 5th Division in Korea while simultaneously strengthening homeland defenses. The army's contingency plans which were both offensive and defensive, depended on the outcome of the naval operations.

Clashes between Chinese and Japanese forces at Pungdo and Seongwhan caused irreversible changes to Sino-Japanese relations and meant that a state of war now existed between the two countries. The two governments officially declared war on August 1. Initially, the general staff's objective was to secure the Korean peninsula before the arrival of winter and then land forces near Shanhaiguan. However, as the navy was unable to bring the Beiyang fleet into battle in mid-August, temporarily withdrew from the Yellow Sea to refit and replenish its ships. As a consequence, in late August the general staff ordered an advance overland to the Zhili plain via Korea in order to capture bases on the Liaodong Peninsula to prevent Chinese forces from interfering with the drive on Beijing. The First Army with two divisions was activated on September 1. In mid-September 17, the Chinese forces defeated at Pyongyang and occupied the city, as the remaining Chinese troops retreated northward. The navy's stunning victory in the Yalu on September 17, was crucial to the Japanese as it allowed the Second Army with three divisions and one brigade to land unopposed on the Liaodong Peninsula about 100 miles north of Port Arthur which controlled the entry to the Bohai Gulf, in mid-October. While, the First Army pursued the remaining Chinese forces from Korea across the Yalu River, Second Army occupied the city of Dairen on November 8 and then seized the fortress and harbor at Port Arthur on November 25. Farther north, the First army's offensive stalled and was beset by supply problems and winter weather.

Boxer Rebellion

In 1899–1900, Boxer attacks against foreigners in China intensified, resulting in the siege of the diplomatic legations in Beijing. An international force consisting of British, French, Russian, German, Italian, Austro-Hungarian, American, and Japanese troops was eventually assembled to relieve the legations. The Japanese provided the largest contingent of troops, 20,840, as well as 18 warships.

A small, hastily assembled, vanguard force of about 2,000 troops, under the command of British Admiral Edward Seymour, departed by rail, from Tianjin, for the legations in early June. On June 12, mixed Boxer and Chinese regular army forces halted the advance, some 30 miles from the capital. The road-bound and badly outnumbered allies withdrew to the vicinity of Tianjin, having suffered more than 300 casualties. The army general staff in Tokyo became aware of the worsening conditions in China and had drafted ambitious contingency plans, but the government, in light of the Triple Intervention refused to deploy large forces unless requested by the western powers. However, three days later, the general staff did dispatch a provisional force of 1,300 troops, commanded by Major General Fukushima Yasumasa, to northern China. Fukushima was chosen because his ability to speak fluent English which enabled him to communicate with the British commander. The force landed near Tianjin on July 5.

On June 17, with tensions increasing, naval Rikusentai from Japanese ships had joined British, Russian, and German sailors to seize the Dagu forts near Tianjin. Four days later, the Qing court declared war on the foreign powers. The British, in light of the precarious situation, were compelled to ask Japan for additional reinforcements, as the Japanese had the only readily available forces in the region. Britain at the time was heavily engaged in the Boer War, and, consequently, a large part of the British army was tied down in South Africa. Deploying large numbers of troops from British garrisons in India would take too much time and weaken internal security there. Overriding personal doubts, Foreign Minister Aoki Shūzō calculated that the advantages of participating in an allied coalition were too attractive to ignore. Prime Minister Yamagata likewise concurred, but others in the cabinet demanded that there be guarantees from the British in return for the risks and costs of a major deployment of Japanese troops. On July 6, the 5th Infantry Division was alerted for possible deployment to China, but without a timetable being set. Two days later, on July 8, with more ground troops urgently needed to lift the siege of the foreign legations at Peking, the British ambassador offered the Japanese government one million British pounds in exchange for Japanese participation.

Shortly afterward, advance units of the 5th Division departed for China, bringing Japanese strength to 3,800 personnel, of the then-17,000 allied force. The commander of the 5th Division, Lt. General Yamaguchi Motoomi, had taken operational control from Fukushima. A second, stronger allied expeditionary army stormed Tianjin, on July 14, and occupied the city. The allies then consolidated and awaited the remainder of the 5th Division and other coalition reinforcements. In early August, the expedition pushed towards the capital where on August 14, it lifted the Boxer siege. By that time, the 13,000-strong Japanese force was the largest single contingent, making up about 40 percent of the approximately 33,000 strong allied expeditionary force. Japanese troops involved in the fighting had acquitted themselves well, although a British military observer felt their aggressiveness, densely packed formations, and over-willingness to attack cost them excessive casualties. For example, during the Tianjin fighting, the Japanese, while comprising less than one quarter (3,800) of the total allied force of 17,000, suffered more than half of the casualties, 400 out of 730. Similarly at Beijing, the Japanese, constituting slightly less than half of the assault force, accounted for almost two-thirds of the losses, 280 of 453.

Russo-Japanese War

The Russo–Japanese War (1904–1905) was the result of tensions between Russia and Japan, grown largely out of rival imperialist ambitions toward Manchuria and Korea. The Japanese army inflicted severe losses against the Russians; however, they were not able to deal a decisive blow to the Russian armies. Over-reliance on infantry led to large casualties among Japanese forces, especially during the siege of Port Arthur.

World War I

The Empire of Japan entered the war on the Entente side. Although tentative plans were made to send an expeditionary force of between 100,000 and 500,000 men to France, ultimately the only action in which the Imperial Japanese Army was involved was the careful and well executed attack on the German concession of Qingdao in 1914.

Inter-war years

Siberian intervention

During 1917–18, Japan continued to extend its influence and privileges in China via the Nishihara Loans.
During the Siberian Intervention, following the collapse of the Russian Empire after the Bolshevik Revolution, the Imperial Japanese Army initially planned to send more than 70,000 troops to occupy Siberia as far west as Lake Baikal. The army general staff came to view the Tsarist collapse as an opportunity to free Japan from any future threat from Russia by detaching Siberia and forming an independent buffer state. The plan was scaled back considerably due to opposition from the United States.

In July 1918, the U.S. President, Woodrow Wilson, asked the Japanese government to supply 7,000 troops as part of an international coalition of 24,000 troops to support the American Expeditionary Force Siberia. After a heated debate in the Diet, the government of Prime Minister Terauchi Masatake agreed to send 12,000 troops, but under the command of Japan, rather than as part of an international coalition. Japan and the United States sent forces to Siberia to bolster the armies of the White movement leader Admiral Aleksandr Kolchak against the Bolshevik Red Army.

Once the political decision had been reached, the Imperial Japanese Army took over full control under Chief of Staff General Yui Mitsue; and by November 1918, more than 70,000 Japanese troops had occupied all ports and major towns in the Russian Maritime Provinces and eastern Siberia.

In June 1920, the United States and its allied coalition partners withdrew from Vladivostok, after the capture and execution of the White Army leader, Admiral Kolchak, by the Red Army. However, the Japanese decided to stay, primarily due to fears of the spread of communism so close to Japan and Japanese-controlled Korea. The Japanese Army provided military support to the Japanese-backed Provisional Priamurye Government, based in Vladivostok, against the Moscow-backed Far Eastern Republic.

The continued Japanese presence concerned the United States, which suspected that Japan had territorial designs on Siberia and the Russian Far East. Subjected to intense diplomatic pressure by the United States and Great Britain, and facing increasing domestic opposition due to the economic and human cost, the administration of Prime Minister Katō Tomosaburō withdrew the Japanese forces in October 1922.

Rise of militarism

In the 1920s the Imperial Japanese Army expanded rapidly and by 1927 had a force of 300,000 men. Unlike western countries, the Army enjoyed a great deal of independence from government. Under the provisions of the Meiji Constitution, the War Minister was held accountable only to the Emperor (Hirohito) himself, and not to the elected civilian government. In fact, Japanese civilian administrations needed the support of the Army in order to survive. The Army controlled the appointment of the War Minister, and in 1936 a law was passed that stipulated that only an active duty general or lieutenant-general could hold the post. As a result, military spending as a proportion of the national budget rose disproportionately in the 1920s and 1930s, and various factions within the military exerted disproportionate influence on Japanese foreign policy.

The Imperial Japanese Army was originally known simply as the Army (rikugun) but after 1928, as part of the Army's turn toward romantic nationalism and also in the service of its political ambitions, it retitled itself the Imperial Army (kōgun).

In 1923, the army consisted of 21 divisions, but in accordance with the 1924 reform it was reduced to 17 divisions. Two leaps in the development of the military industry (1906–1910 and 1931–1934) made it possible to re-equip the armed forces.

Invasion of China

In 1931, the Imperial Japanese Army had an overall strength of 198,880 officers and men, organized into 17 divisions.
The Manchurian incident, as it became known in Japan, was a pretended sabotage of a local Japanese-owned railway, an attack staged by Japan but blamed on Chinese dissidents. Action by the military, largely independent of the civilian leadership, led to the invasion of Manchuria in 1931 and, later, to the Second Sino-Japanese War, in 1937. As war approached, the Imperial Army's influence with the Emperor waned and the influence of the Imperial Japanese Navy increased. Nevertheless, by 1938 the Army had been expanded to 34 divisions.

Conflict with the Soviet Union
From 1932 to 1945 the Empire of Japan and the Soviet Union had a series of conflicts. Japan had set its military sights on Soviet territory as a result of the Hokushin-ron doctrine, and the Japanese establishment of a puppet state in Manchuria brought the two countries into conflict. The war lasted on and off with the last battles of the 1930s (the Battle of Lake Khasan and the Battles of Khalkhin Gol) ending in a decisive victory for the Soviets. The conflicts stopped with the signing of the Soviet–Japanese Neutrality Pact on April 13, 1941. However, later, at the Yalta Conference, Stalin agreed to declare war on Japan; and on August 5, 1945, the Soviet Union voided their neutrality agreement with Japan.

World War II

In 1941, the Imperial Japanese Army had 51 divisions and various special-purpose artillery, cavalry, anti-aircraft, and armored units with a total of 1,700,000 people. At the beginning of the Second World War, most of the Japanese Army (27 divisions) was stationed in China. A further 13 divisions defended the Mongolian border, due to concerns about a possible attack by the Soviet Union. From 1942, soldiers were sent to Hong Kong (23rd Army), the Philippines (14th Army), Thailand (15th Army), Burma (15th Army), Dutch East Indies (16th Army), and Malaya (25th Army). By 1945, there were 6 million soldiers in the Imperial Japanese Army.

From 1943, Japanese troops suffered from a shortage of supplies, especially food, medicine, munitions, and armaments, largely due to submarine interdiction of supplies, and losses to Japanese shipping, which was worsened by a longstanding rivalry with the Imperial Japanese Navy. The lack of supplies caused large numbers of fighter aircraft to become unserviceable for lack of spare parts, and "as many as two-thirds of Japan's total military deaths [to result] from illness or starvation".

Salary 
Compared to respective armies in Europe or America, soldiers in the Imperial Japanese Army received a rather meagre salary; however, the cost of living in Japan was also cheaper than in most Western nations. The below table gives figures from December 1941, when one Japanese yen was worth approximately $0.23.

For comparison, in 1942, an American private was paid approximately $50 per month (or 204 yen), meaning the lowest ranking soldier in the United States military was earning equivalent to the maximum salary of an Imperial Japanese major, or the base salary of an Imperial Japanese lieutenant colonel, and about 25 times as much as an Imperial Japanese soldier of the same rank. While disproportionate salary ranges were not uncommon between militaries during World War II, for example Australian enlistees could expect to receive roughly triple as much in pay as their counterparts fighting for the United Kingdom, by any standards, despite being widely considered a "first rate" or professional fighting force, men serving in the IJA were very poorly compensated.

Complicating matters further was the fact that, by 1942, most Japanese soldiers were paid using the Japanese military yen (JMY), an unbacked currency that could not be redeemed for the regular Japanese yen. In territories under Japanese occupation, the military yenor "Japanese invasion money", as it came to be known by the localswas the only legal tender in circulation. The Japanese authorities seized or ordered surrendered all other bank notes in territories under their occupation and provided compensation at an "exchange rate" as they saw fit, in the form of JMYs. This had the effect of affording Japanese soldiers in many occupied territories a higher degree of return for their low pay than they otherwise would have received. However, at the end of the war, the Imperial Japanese ministry of finance cancelled all military bank notes, rendering the military yen worthless.

War crimes

Throughout the Second Sino-Japanese War and World War II, the Imperial Japanese Army had shown immense brutality and engaged in numerous atrocities against civilians, as well as prisoners of war – with the Nanking Massacre being the most well known example. Other war crimes committed by the Imperial Japanese Army included rape and forced prostitution, death marches, using biological warfare against civilians, and the execution of prisoners of war. Such atrocities throughout the war caused many millions of deaths.

Post-World War II

Ground Self-Defense Force

Article 9 of the Japanese Constitution renounced the right to use force as a means of resolving disputes. This was enacted by the Japanese in order to prevent militarism, which had led to conflict. However, in 1947 the Public Security Force was formed; later in 1954, in the early stages of the Cold War, the Public Security Force formed the basis of the newly created Ground Self-Defense Force. Although significantly smaller than the former Imperial Japanese Army and nominally for defensive purposes only, this force constitutes the modern army of Japan.

Continued resistance

Separately, some soldiers of the Imperial Japanese Army continued to fight on isolated Pacific islands until at least the 1970s, with the last known Japanese soldier surrendering in 1974. Intelligence officer Hiroo Onoda, who surrendered on Lubang Island in the Philippines in March 1974, and Teruo Nakamura, who surrendered on the Indonesian island of Morotai in December 1974, appear to have been the last holdouts.

Growth and organization of the IJA

 1870: consisted of 12,000 men.
 1873: Seven divisions of c. 36,000 men (c. 46,250 including reserves)
 1885: consisted of seven divisions including the Imperial Guard Division.
 In the early 1900s, the IJA consisted of 12 divisions, the Imperial Guard Division, and numerous other units. These contained the following:
 380,000 active duty and 1st Reserve personnel: former Class A and B(1) conscripts after two-year active tour with 17 and 1/2 year commitment
 50,000 Second line Reserve: Same as above but former Class B(2) conscripts
 220,000 National Army
 1st National Army: 37- to 40-year-old men from end of 1st Reserve to 40 years old.
 2nd National Army: untrained 20-year-olds and over-40-year-old trained reserves.
 4,250,000 men available for service and mobilization.
 1922: 21 divisions and 308,000 men
 1924: Post-WWI reductions to 16 divisions and 250,800 men
 1925: Reduction to 12 divisions
 1934: army increased to 17 divisions
 1936: 250,000 active.
 1940: 376,000 active with 2 million reserves in 31 divisions
 2 divisions in Japan (Imperial Guard plus one other)
 2 divisions in Korea
 27 divisions in China and Manchuria
 In late 1941: 460,000 active in
 41 divisions
 2 in Japan and Korea
 12 in Manchuria
 27  in China
 plus 59 brigade equivalents.
 Independent brigades, Independent Mixed Brigades, Cavalry Brigades, Amphibious Brigades, Independent Mixed regiments, Independent Regiments.
 1945: 5 million active in 145 divisions (includes three Imperial Guard), plus numerous individual units, with a large Volunteer Fighting Corps.
 includes 650,000 Imperial Japanese Army Air Service.
 Japan Defense Army in 1945 had 55 divisions (53 Infantry and two armor) and 32 brigades (25 infantry and seven armor) with 2.35 million men.
 2.25 million Army Labour Troops
 1.3 million Navy Labour Troops
 250,000 Special Garrison Force
 20,000 Kempetai
Total military in August 1945 was 6,095,000 including 676,863 Army Air Service.

Casualties
Over the course of the Imperial Japanese Army's existence, millions of its soldiers were either killed, wounded or listed as missing in action.
 Taiwan Expedition of 1874: 543 (12 killed in battle and 531 by disease)
 First Sino-Japanese War: The IJA suffered 1,132 dead and 3,758 wounded
 Russo-Japanese War: The number of total Japanese dead in combat is put at around 47,000, with around 80,000 if disease is included
 World War I: 1,455 Japanese were killed, mostly at the Battle of Tsingtao
 World War II:
 Deaths
 Between 2,120,000 and 2,190,000 Imperial Armed Forces dead including non-combat deaths (includes 1,760,955 killed in action),
 KIA Breakdown by Theatre:
 Army 1931–1945: 1,569,661  [China: 435,600 KIA, Against U.S. Forces: 659,650 KIA, Burma Campaign: 163,000 KIA, Australian Combat Zone: 199,511 KIA, French Indochina: 7,900 KIA, U.S.S.R/Manchuria: 45,900 KIA, Others/Japan: 58,100 KIA]
 Navy: 473,800 KIA All Theatres.
 672,000 known civilian dead,
 810,000 missing in action and presumed dead.
 7,500 prisoners of war

See also

 Artillery of Japan
 Double Leaf Society
 Ethnic Taiwanese Imperial Japan Serviceman
 Imperial Japanese rations
 Imperial Way Faction or Kodô-Ha
 Japanese army and diplomatic codes
 Japanese Army Railways and Shipping Section
 Japanese Army and Navy Strategies for South Seas areas (1942)
 Japanese holdouts ("stragglers") who surrendered after 1945
 Kokuryū-kaiThe Black Dragon Society
 List of Bombs in use by Imperial Japanese Army
 List of Japanese military equipment of World War II
 List of Japanese Army military engineer vehicles of World War II
 List of Japanese government and military commanders of World War II
 List of Japanese Infantry divisions
 List of Radars in use by Imperial Japanese Army
 Military Medal of Honor (Japan)
 Nanshin-ron or Strike South Group
 Ranks of the Imperial Japanese Army
 Rikugun Shikan Gakko
 Tosei-Ha
 Uniforms of the Imperial Japanese Army

Notes

References

Bibliography

Further reading
 Barker, A.J. (1979) Japanese Army Handbook, 1939–1945 (London: Ian Allan, 1979)
 Best, Antony. (2002) British intelligence and the Japanese challenge in Asia, 1914–1941 (Palgrave/Macmillan, 2002).
 
 
 Denfeld, D. Colt. (1997) Hold the Marianas: The Japanese Defense of the Mariana Islands (White Mane Publishing Company, 1997).
 Coox, A.D. (1985) Nomonhan: Japan against Russia, 1939 (Stanford UP, 1985)
 Coox, A.D. (1988) "The Effectiveness of the Japanese Military Establishment in the Second World War", in A.R. Millett and W. Murray, eds, Military Effectiveness, Volume III: the Second World War (Allen & Unwin, 1988), pp. 1–44
 
 Ford, Douglas. (2008) "'The best equipped army in Asia'?: US military intelligence and the Imperial Japanese Army before the Pacific War, 1919–1941." International journal of intelligence and counterintelligence 21.1 (2008): 86–121.
 Ford, Douglas. (2009) "Dismantling the ‘Lesser Men’and ‘Supermen’ myths: US intelligence on the imperial Japanese army after the fall of the Philippines, winter 1942 to spring 1943." Intelligence and National Security 24.4 (2009): 542–573.  online
 Frühstück, Sabine. (2007) Uneasy warriors: Gender, memory, and popular culture in the Japanese army (Univ of California Press, 2007).
 Gruhl, Werner. (2010) Imperial Japan's World War Two: 1931–1945 (Transaction Publishers).
 
 
 Kublin, Hyman. "The 'Modern' Army of Early Meiji Japan". The Far Eastern Quarterly, 9#1 (1949), pp. 20–41.
 Kuehn, John T.  (2014) A Military History of Japan: From the Age of the Samurai to the 21st Century (ABC-CLIO, 2014).
 Norman, E. Herbert. "Soldier and Peasant in Japan: The Origins of Conscription." Pacific Affairs 16#1 (1943), pp. 47–64.
 Rottman, Gordon L. (2013) Japanese Army in World War II: Conquest of the Pacific 1941–42 (Bloomsbury Publishing, 2013).
 Rottman, Gordon L. (2012) Japanese Infantryman 1937–45: Sword of the Empire (Bloomsbury Publishing, 2012).
 Sisemore, Major James D. (2015) The Russo-Japanese War, Lessons Not Learned (Pickle Partners Publishing, 2015).
 Storry, Richard. (1956) "Fascism in Japan: The Army Mutiny of February 1936" History Today (Nov 1956) 6#11 pp 717–726.
 Wood, James B. (2007) Japanese Military Strategy in the Pacific War: Was Defeat Inevitable? (Rowman & Littlefield Publishers, 2007).
 Yenne, Bill. (2014) The Imperial Japanese Army: The Invincible Years 1941–42 (Bloomsbury Publishing, 2014).

Primary sources
 United States War Department. TM 30–480 Handbook On Japanese Military Forces, 1942 (1942) online; 384pp; highly detailed description of wartime IJA by U.S. Army Intelligence.

External links

 Overview of Imperial Japanese Army weapons and armaments in World War II
 Army of the Land of the Rising Sun 100 years ago. Part 1. Leap from the Middle Ages into the XX century  (part 1 of 4)
 Japanese war posters
 The PBS program Victory in the Pacific 
 Imperial Japanese Army 3rd Platoon reenactor's resource 

 
1868 establishments in Japan
1945 disestablishments in Japan
Japan
Empire of Japan
Japan in World War II
Japanese Army
Military history of Japan
Military of the Empire of Japan
Military units and formations disestablished in 1945
Military units and formations established in 1868